Emmanuel Guillaud (born 1970) is a French artist.

Biography 
Guillaud is a French visual artist working with photography. He mostly exhibits his work as synchronized slideshows / multi-screens installations. Resident at Villa Kujoyama.

Installation works (selected) 
 2018: (brûler les abîmes) / (burning abysses), version at St Cavalier, Malte 
 2018: (brûler les abîmes) / (burning abysses), version at Chateau Coquelle, Dunkerque 
 2017: (brûler les abîmes) / (burning abysses), version at La Plate-Forme, Dunkerque
 2017: Untitled (after Piranesi), version at l'Institut; Institut Franco-japonais de Tokyo
 2015: Until the sun rises (version juin 2015): Pavillon Vendôme, Centre d'art contemporain de Clichy
 2015: Untitled (lines), Expositions ravages, Le Point Ephémère, Paris
 2011: Until the sun rises (in its Jan 2011 version, 3 synchronized projections), Singapore Art Museum
 2010: Until the sun rises (in its May 2010 version, 4 synchronized projections with sound made in collaboration with Jennifer Bonn ), School Gallery, Paris (solo show)
 2009/2010: I/O (-side), part of the group show No man's land in the about-to-be-destroyed buildings of the former French Embassy in Tokyo
 2010: gp projections 1, gp gallery, Tokyo 
 2009: Until the sun rises (in its Aug 2010 version, 3 synchronized projections), Noorderlicht Gallery, Netherlands
 2005: (going nowhere), Super Deluxe, Tokyo. Slideshow part of "Pecha Kucha Nights"

Other shows (selected) 
 2015: Untitled (traces), Exposition Watchqueen, ONE National Gay & Lesbian Archives ONE Archives at USC, Los Angeles 
 2012: Black Closer to White, Emmanuel Guillaud & Takano Ryudai, Yumiko Chiba Viewing Room, Tokyo 
 2011: Art Protects, Galerie Yvon Lambert, Paris
 2011: Format Photography Festival, Derby UK 
 2010: Tokyo Wonderwall / 10th anniversary, Museum of Contemporary Art Tokyo
 2010: Des photographes, des Japons, Institut Franco-Japonais de Tokyo 
 2009 / 2010: Going from Nowhere, Philadelphia Photographic Art Center, USA
 2009: Descubrimientos, PHotoEspaña, Madrid
 2009: Art Protects, Galerie Yvon Lambert, Paris
 2005: (going nowhere), Tokyo Government Gallery, Tokyo (solo show) 
 2005: Tokyo Wonderwall 2005, Museum of Contemporary Art Tokyo

Artist's books and catalogues (selected) 
 2012: Notes on unfinished projects, Emmanuel Guillaud & Kiyoshi Takami, Heuristic / artbeat publisher (Tokyo)
 2010: Tokyo Wonderwall / 10th anniversary (catalogue)
 2010: No man's land (Catalogue of the group show)

References

External links 
 (en) Artist's website
 (en) Artist's page at the Noorderlicht gallery
 (en) Review of "Until the sun rises", Take Out, Singapore
 (fr) Review of "Until the sun rises", Le Monde
 (en) "Artists to watch in 2009", Art and Living

Living people
French artists
1970 births